Cave di Cusa or Rocche di Cusa was an ancient stone quarry in Sicily. It is located 3 kilometers south of the town Campobello di Mazara in the province of Trapani, Italy. It is 1.8 kilometer long and is on a ridge that spans from east to west. This site was quarried beginning in the first half of the 6th century BC and its stone was used to construct the temples in the ancient Greek city Selinunte. It was abandoned in 409 BC when the city was captured by the Carthaginians. It is now an official Sicilian Archeological Zone and a popular tourist site.

History

Cave di Cusa was the source of stone used to build the town of Selinunte's sacred temple. Selinunte was a Greek temple that was located 13 km southwest from the quarry. That area of Sicily was inhabited mainly be the ancient Greeks. The stone found at Cave di Cusa site was very suitable for building and therefore a material of choice. Its texture and tufa resistant limestone material made it ideal and perfect for the construction of the sacred Greek temple. This quarry was mined for many years, 150 to be exact. There is evidence to believe that at one time, 150 people worked there. Many of them were slave laborers.

In 409 BC Cave di Cusa was suddenly abandoned. This was due to the unexpected and unwanted arrival of Carthaginian invader Hannibal Mago. This visit broke out into a war between the opposing forces, and ultimately Selinunte was defeated. The town was destroyed after the defeat, and no work ever occurred at the quarry again. The slaves and laborers fled the scene and escaped to safety. The blocks of stone that were currently being worked on were completely left alone and have formed the geography of the site today. In its day, Cave di Cusa was very efficient, so one might wonder how this site would have transformed throughout history if it had not been for its abandonment.

Archaeological investigation
Archaeological investigation on the site has given us a lot of information regarding Cave di Cusa and how it was used. The site itself is covered in 60 blocks of rock, many of them cylindrical in nature, in various stages of carving, strewn haphazardly around the site (some in situ) that were originally intended for the construction of the temple. The stone from this site was used for columns at the temple, and many columns still exist at the site today. The rock is in different stages of being quarried, so it is evident that the abandonment of the site occurred rather quickly. There is evidence of pick marks on the rocks from various stone tools, so archaeologists have been able to determine the methods used to quarry the stone. Many efficient and advanced methods were used to carve the stone, like grooves and holes put on "architraves" that allowed ropes and beams to be threaded through them to aid in lifting the rock. It shows how crafty and intelligent ancient peoples were in working on this site.

Tourism
In modern times, Cave di Cusa has become a popular tourist destination in Sicily. The ancient Greek culture and influence of Selinunte and the surrounding areas is evidenced here. It is said to be beautiful in the spring, due to its array of flowers and pillars and people have been known to have picnics there. There are also many bed and breakfasts located nearby, due to the large amount of tourism. In addition, it is most importantly a piece of history and has cultural value to it. The pillars have been preserved very well since they were interrupted in their production. Therefore, many visitors find it very educational as well as beautiful.

References

Further reading

External links
Official website 

Quarries
Archaeological sites in Sicily
Province of Trapani
Surface mines in Italy
Selinunte